The 1974 Texas Rangers season involved the Rangers finishing second in the American League West with a record of 84 wins and 76 losses (two rained-out games were never completed).  It would be only the second time in franchise history (to that point) that the club finished over .500 and the first since the club relocated to Arlington, Texas.  The club became the first (and, to date, only) team to finish over .500 after two consecutive 100-loss seasons.

Offseason 
 October 25, 1973: Bill Madlock and Vic Harris were traded by the Rangers to the Chicago Cubs for Ferguson Jenkins.

Regular season 
During the season, Ferguson Jenkins won 25 games for the Rangers, which was Jenkins' personal best for a season and remains the Rangers franchise record for wins by a pitcher in one season. He would also be the third pitcher in the history of the American League to win 25 games in the 20th century and not win the Cy Young Award.

Ten Cent Beer Night 

On June 4, in one of the most remarkably ill-conceived promotions in Major League Baseball history, fans at Cleveland Municipal Stadium for a Cleveland Indians vs. Texas Rangers game were served as many beers as they wanted for just 10¢ each. After numerous instances of drunken fans throwing debris or running onto the field—"streaking" in many instances—the situation boiled over in the 9th inning when a fan ran onto the field and snatched Rangers outfielder Jeff Burroughs' cap and glove. Burroughs' teammates charged out to his aid, followed by hundreds of rioting Cleveland fans who poured out onto the field.

Season standings

Record vs. opponents

Notable transactions 
 April 25, 1974: Mike Kekich was signed as a free agent by the Rangers.
 June 5, 1974: 1974 Major League Baseball Draft
Tommy Boggs was drafted by the Rangers in the 1st round (2nd pick).
Gary Gray was drafted by the Rangers in the 10th round.

Roster

Player stats

Batting

Starters by position 
Note: Pos = Position; G = Games played; AB = At bats; H = Hits; Avg. = Batting average; HR = Home runs; RBI = Runs batted in

Other batters 
Note: G = Games played; AB = At bats; H = Hits; Avg. = Batting average; HR = Home runs; RBI = Runs batted in

Pitching

Starting pitchers 
Note: G = Games pitched; IP = Innings pitched; W = Wins; L = Losses; ERA = Earned run average; SO = Strikeouts

Other pitchers 
Note: G = Games pitched; IP = Innings pitched; W = Wins; L = Losses; ERA = Earned run average; SO = Strikeouts

Relief pitchers 
Note: G = Games pitched; W = Wins; L = Losses; SV = Saves; ERA = Earned run average; SO = Strikeouts

Awards and honors 
 Jeff Burroughs, AL MVP
 Mike Hargrove, AL Rookie of the Year
 Ferguson Jenkins, Comeback Player of The Year
 Billy Martin, Associated Press AL Manager of the Year

All-Stars 
1974 Major League Baseball All-Star Game
 Jeff Burroughs, left field, starter
 Jim Sundberg, reserve

Farm system 

LEAGUE CHAMPIONS: Spokane, Gastonia

Notes

References 

1974 Texas Rangers team page at Baseball Reference
1974 Texas Rangers team page at www.baseball-almanac.com

Texas Rangers seasons
Texas Rangers season
Texas Rang